Florența Mihai (2 September 1955 – 14 October 2015) was a professional tennis player from Romania.

She was the runner-up in two events at the 1977 French Open. She lost in the singles final to Mima Jaušovec in three sets, and partnered with Iván Molina, lost in the mixed doubles final to John McEnroe and Mary Carillo in straight sets.

Together with Virginia Ruzici, Mihai won three consecutive gold medals in the doubles at Summer Universiades in 1977, 1979 and 1981.

Grand Slam finals

Singles: 1 (0–1)

Mixed doubles: 1 (0–1)

WTA finals

Singles (1–1)

Doubles (1–4)

ITF finals

Singles (5–8)

Doubles (11–7)

Grand Slam singles tournament timeline

Note: The Australian Open was held twice in 1977, in January and December.

See also 
 Performance timelines for all female tennis players who reached at least one Grand Slam final

References

External links
 
 
 

Romanian female tennis players
Universiade medalists in tennis
1955 births
2015 deaths
Universiade gold medalists for Romania